Kerry Sharpe is a member of the Legislative Council of the Isle of Man, having been elected in March 2018 and re-elected in March 2020.

Sharpe graduated from St Catharine's College, Cambridge.

References

Members of the Legislative Council of the Isle of Man
Manx women in politics
Year of birth missing (living people)
Place of birth missing (living people)
Living people